Balacra caeruleifascia is a moth of the family Erebidae. It was described by Francis Walker in 1856. It is found in Angola, Cameroon, the Democratic Republic of the Congo, Ghana, Guinea, Ivory Coast, Liberia, Nigeria, Sierra Leone and
Togo.

References

Balacra
Moths described in 1856
Erebid moths of Africa